Meljine (Montenegrin and Serbian: Мељине) is a small town located in the municipality of Herceg Novi, Montenegro.

Demographics
According to the 2003 census, the town has a population of 1,120 people.

According to the 2011 census, its population was 1,123.

References

Populated places in Herceg Novi Municipality
Populated places in Bay of Kotor
Coastal towns in Montenegro
Serb communities in Montenegro